The 1923 Campeonato de Portugal Final was the final match of the 1922–23 Campeonato de Portugal, the 2nd season of the Portuguese football cup, organised by the Portuguese Football Union.

The match took place on Sunday, 24 June 1923, at the Santo Stadium in Faro, between Lisbon side Sporting CP and Coimbra side Académica. Sporting won the match 3–0, with goals from Francisco Stromp and from two penalties by Joaquim Ferreira. In doing so, Sporting CP conquered their 1st title in the competition.

Road to the final

Note: In all results below, the score of the finalist is given first (all games were played at a neutral venue).

Match

Summary
Despite some opposition from Académica, because of the proximity of the academic exams, and even though Sporting CP expressed the desire to play the final at Coimbra (where they won their semi-final match against FC Porto), the match was played at Santo Stadium, the new ground of Farense. It was also a sportsman from Farense, Eduardo Vieira, who was assigned as referee.

Only 12 minutes had passed since the beginning of the game when Francisco Stromp put the ball into the net from Carlos Fernandes's cross. In the 18th minute, a penalty was awarded to Sporting CP for an handball on the sequence of a corner kick, which Joaquim Ferreira converted successfully. Still in the first half, Francisco Stromp was injured and left the ground.

Sporting CP lined up with 10 men for the second half but scored the final goal from another penalty in the 53rd minute, again converted by Joaquim Ferreira. Some time later, Francisco Stromp was able to return to the game, which finished 3–0 for Sporting CP.

Details

References

1923
1923 in association football
Associação Académica de Coimbra – O.A.F. matches
Sporting CP matches
Sport in Faro, Portugal
1922–23 in Portuguese football